Several bacterial species are named after institutions, including acronyms which are spelled as they would be read; e.g., CDC becomes Ce+de+ce+a.
The names are changed in the female nominative case, either by changing the ending to -a or to the diminutive -ella, depending on the name.

 Afipia – AFIP (Armed Force Institute of Pathology), USA
 Basfia – BASF SE (a chemical company in Ludwigshafen, Germany)
 Cedecea – CDC (Centers for Disease Control), USA
 Deefgea – DFG (Deutsche Forschungsgemeinschaft; German Science Foundation), Germany
 Desemzia – DSMZ (Deutsche Sammlung von Mikroorganismen und Zellkulturen), Germany
 Emticicia – MTCC (Microbial Type Culture Collection and Gene Bank), India
 Iamia – IAM (Institute of Applied Microbiology at the University of Tokyo), Japan
 Ideonella – Ideon Research Center, University of Lund, Sweden
 Inhella – Inha University, Korea
 Kaistella – KAIST (Korea Advanced Institute of Science and Technology), Korea
 Kaistia – KAIST (Korea Advanced Institute of Science and Technology), Korea
 Kistimonas – KIST (Korea Institute of Science and Technology ), Korea
 Kordia – KORDI (Korea Ocean Research and Development Institute), Korea
 Kordiimonas – KORDI (Korea Ocean Research and Development Institute), Korea
 Kribbella – KRIBB (Korean Research Institute of Bioscience and Biotechnology), Korea
 Kribbia – KRIBB (Korean Research Institute of Bioscience and Biotechnology), Korea
 Lonepinella – Lone Pine Koala Sanctuary (a private zoo), Australia
 Mameliella – MME laboratory (Marine microbial ecology laboratory), China
 Mesonia – MES (Marine Experimental Station of the Pacific Institute of Bioorganic Chemistry), Russia
 Niabella – NIAB (National Institute of Agricultural Biotechnology), Korea
 Niastella – NIAST (National Institute of Agricultural Science and Technology), Korea
 Nubsella – NUBS (Nihon University College of Bioresource Sciences), Japan
 Pibocella – PIBOC (Pacific Institute of Bioorganic Chemistry), Russia
 Rikenella – RIKEN (Rikagaku Kenkyusho; Institute of Physical and Chemical Research), Japan
 Rudaea – RDA (Rural Development Administration), Korea
 Rudanella – RDA (Rural Development Administration), Korea
 Sciscionella – SCISCIO (South China Sea Institute of Oceanology), China
 Stakelama – State Key Laboratory of Marine Environment Science, China
 Tistrella – TISTR (Thailand Institute of Scientific and Technological Research), Thailand
 Waddlia – WADDL (Washington Animal Disease Diagnostic-Laboratory), USA
 Woodsholea – Woods Hole Oceanographic Institution, Massachusetts, USA
 Yimella – YIM (Yunnan Institute of Microbiology), China
 Yokenella – Kokuritsu-yoboueisei-kenkyusho (National Institute of Disease Prevention and Health), Japan

See also 
 List of bacterial genera named after geographical names
 List of bacterial genera named after personal names
 List of bacterial genera named after mythological figures
 list of Latin and Greek words commonly used in systematic names
 List of Bacteria genera
 List of bacterial orders
 List of sequenced prokaryotic genomes
 List of clinically important bacteria
 List of sequenced archaeal genomes
 List of Archaea genera
 Synonym (taxonomy)
 Taxonomy
 LPSN, list of accepted bacterial and archaeal names

References